Cerdon is the name of several communes in France:

 Cerdon, in the Ain département
 Cerdon, in the Loiret département

It is also a pink sparkling wine from grapes originating in the village of the Ain department.